Al-Lal "Alex" Mohamed Amar (born 25 December 1957) is a  Spanish retired footballer who played as a right back or a central defender.

Club career
Born in Melilla, Álex played his entire career in Andalusia, successively representing Real Betis, Xerez CD (two spells), Recreativo de Huelva and Polideportivo Ejido and amassing La Liga totals of 206 matches and two goals over eight seasons, all with the first club. On 1 April 1984, in a 1–0 win against RCD Mallorca at Barcelona's Mini Estadi, he scored their 1.000th goal at the Spanish top level.

In the summer of 1991, after Xerez's relegation from Segunda División, Álex retired professionally from the game at the age of 33. Subsequently, he worked with Betis in directorial capacities.

References

External links

1957 births
Living people
Spanish sportspeople of Moroccan descent
Spanish footballers
Footballers from Melilla
Association football defenders
La Liga players
Segunda División players
Segunda División B players
Tercera División players
Betis Deportivo Balompié footballers
Real Betis players
Xerez CD footballers
Recreativo de Huelva players
Polideportivo Ejido footballers
Spain youth international footballers